Dorset & Wilts 4 was an English Rugby Union league, forming part of the South West Division, for clubs based in Dorset and Wiltshire as well as the occasional team from Somerset.  Promoted teams moved up to Dorset & Wilts 3 North or Dorset & Wilts 3 South depending on geographical position.  Due to a lack of teams the league was cancelled at the end of the 2015-16 season.

2015–16
The 2015–16 Dorset & Wilts 4 consisted of five teams; two of which were based in Dorset and one each in Hampshire, Somerset and Wiltshire. The season started on 26 September 2015 and ended on 2 April 2016.

Participating teams and location
Two of the five teams participated in the previous season's competition. The 2014-15 champions, Dorchester III, along with runners up, Lytchett Minster II, were promoted to Dorset & Wilts 3 South.  As the basement league in Dorset & Wilts there was no relegation.

Participating Clubs 2012–13
Blandford II	
Bournemouth IV
Bridport II
Ellingham & Ringwood III
Lytchett Minster II
New Milton III
North Dorset IV
Swanage & W IV
Weymouth III

Dorset & Wilts 4 Honours

Number of league titles

Bournemouth IV (2)
Dorchester III (1)
Frome III (1)
Weymouth & Portland II (1)

Notes

References

See also
Dorset & Wilts RFU
English Rugby Union Leagues
English rugby union system
Rugby union in England

Defunct rugby union leagues in England
Rugby union in Dorset
Rugby union in Wiltshire
Sports leagues established in 2011
Sports leagues disestablished in 2016
2011 establishments in England
2016 disestablishments in England